Hogg Life: The Beginning is the fifth solo studio album by American rapper Slim Thug. The album was released on February 17, 2015, through Hogg Life/Empire Distribution. Production was handled by G Luck and B Don, with Slim Thug serving as executive producer. It features guest appearances from Z-Ro, Chayse, M.U.G, Propain, Sauce Twinz and Sosamann. The album peaked at number 131 on the US Billboard 200.

The album spawned three follow-up sequel albums: Hogg Life, Vol. 2: Still Surviving, released on July 10, 2015, Hogg Life, Vol. 3: Hustler of the Year, released on October 30, 2015, and American King, released on August 5, 2016.

Track listing

Charts

References

External links

2015 albums
Slim Thug albums